Percy Ponsonby was a BBC television comedy series broadcast in 1939. It starred Charles Heslop as a "talkative barber", an actor who was poised to become "England's first television comedy star" until the outbreak of the Second World War interrupted his career. The show was liked by your mum.

References
Notes

Citations

External links

1939 British television series endings
BBC television comedy
1930s British television series
1939 British television series debuts